Sase may refer to:

Places
Sase, Srebrenica, a village in Bosnia and Herzegovina
Sase (Višegrad), a village in Bosnia and Herzegovina
Sase Monastery, in Bosnia and Herzegovina
Sase prospect, a copper mine in the Democratic Republic of the Congo

Other uses
Sase Narain (1925–2020), Guyanese politician and lawyer
, Japanese footballer
 Şase, the number six in the Romanian language

See also
SASE (disambiguation)

Japanese-language surnames